The 2020 Minnesota Golden Gophers baseball team was a baseball team that represented the University of Minnesota in the 2020 NCAA Division I baseball season. The Golden Gophers were members of the Big Ten Conference and played their home games at Siebert Field and U.S. Bank Stadium in Minneapolis, Minnesota. They were led by thirty-ninth-year head coach John Anderson.

The season was cut short in stages by March 12 due to the COVID-19 pandemic.

Previous season
The Golden Gophers finished the 2019 NCAA Division I baseball season 29–27 overall (15–9 conference) and tied for third place in conference standings, qualifying for the 2019 Big Ten Conference baseball tournament.

MLB draft 
The following Golden Gophers on the 2019 roster were selected in the 2019 Major League Baseball draft:

* indicates draftee had no more college eligibility

Roster

Schedule

! style="" | Regular Season
|- valign="top" 

|- bgcolor="#ccffcc"
| 1 || February 14 || vs  || Phoenix Municipal Stadium • Tempe, Arizona || 12–10 || Meyer (1–0) || Kafka (0–1) || Culliver (1) || 307 || 1–0 || –
|- bgcolor="#ffcccc"
| 2 || February 15 || vs  || Phoenix Memorial Stadium • Tempe, Arizona || 6–8 || Chandler (1–0) || Thoresen (0–1) || None || 183 || 1–1 || –
|- bgcolor="#ffcccc"
| 3 || February 16 || vs  || Phoenix Memorial Stadium • Tempe, Arizona || 3–7 || Rustad (1–0) || Fredrickson (0–1) || None || 290 || 1–2 || –
|- bgcolor="#ccffcc"
| 4 || February 17 || vs Arizona || Phoenix Memorial Stadium • Tempe, Arizona || 5–2 || Davis (1–0) || Netz (0–1) || Horton (1) || 520 || 2–2 || 0–0
|- bgcolor="#ffcccc"
| 5 || February 22 || TCU || U.S. Bank Stadium • Minneapolis, Minnesota, || 0–12 || Ray (0–1) || Meyer (1–1) || None || 1255 || 2–3 || –
|- bgcolor="#ccffcc"
| 6 || February 23 || TCU || U.S. Bank Stadium • Minneapolis, Minnesota || 7–6 || Massey (1–0) || King (0–1) || Horton (2) || 938 || 3–3 || –
|- bgcolor="#ffcccc"
| 7 || February 24 || TCU || U.S. Bank Stadium • Minneapolis, Minnesota || 2–11 || Smith (1–0) || Fredrickson (0–2) || None || 242 || 3–4 || –
|- bgcolor="#ccffcc"
| 8 || February 26 || vs  || U.S. Bank Stadium • Minneapolis, Minnesota || 4–2 || Schoeberl (1–0) || McSherry (0–1) || Thoresen (1) || 241 || 4–4 || –
|- bgcolor="#ccffcc"
| 9 || February 28 ||  || U.S. Bank Stadium • Minneapolis, Minnesota || 4–1 || Meyer (2–1) || Sandy (0–2) || None || 1,704 || 5–4 || –
|- bgcolor="#ffcccc"
| 10 || February 29 || No. 14  || U.S. Bank Stadium • Minneapolis, Minnesota || 3–7 || Girard (1–0) || Horton (0–1) || None || 2,540 || 5–5 || –
|-

|- bgcolor="#ffcccc"
| 11 || March 1 || No. 13 NC State || U.S. Bank Stadium • Minneapolis, Minnesota || 7–11 || Harrison (2–0) || Ireland (0–1) || None || 1,436 || 5–6 || –
|- bgcolor="#ffcccc"
| 12 || March 3 ||  || U.S. Bank Stadium • Minneapolis, Minnesota || 4–7 || Harm (1–0) || Kapala (0–1) || Pilla (2) || 555 || 5–7 || –
|- bgcolor="#ffcccc"
| 13 || March 4 || South Dakota State || U.S. Bank Stadium • Minneapolis, Minnesota || 8–10 || Sundquist (1–1) || Anderson (0–1) || Mogen (1) || 202 || 5–8 || –
|- bgcolor="#ccffcc"
| 14 || March 6 ||  || U.S. Bank Stadium • Minneapolis, Minnesota || 6–4 || Meyer (3–1) || Kelly (0–1) || Ireland (1) || 340 || 6–8 || –
|- bgcolor="#ffcccc"
| 15 || March 7 || Utah || U.S. Bank Stadium • Minneapolis, Minnesota || 3–6 || Pierce (1–1) || Massey (1–1) || Schramm (2) || 456 || 6–9 || –
|- bgcolor="#ffcccc"
| 16 || March 8 || Utah || U.S. Bank Stadium • Minneapolis, Minnesota || 11–17 || Giffins (1–1) || Burchill (0–1) || None || 429 || 6–10 || –
|- bgcolor="#ccffcc"
| 17 || March 10 ||  || U.S. Bank Stadium • Minneapolis, Minnesota || 5–3 || Schoeberl (2–0) || Holderfield (0–1) || Ireland (2) || 307 || 7–10 || –
|- bgcolor="#ccffcc"
| 18 || March 11 || Creighton || U.S. Bank Stadium • Minneapolis, Minnesota || 5–4 || Burchill (1–1) || Tebrake (3–2) || Fredrickson (1) || 336 || 8–10 || –
|- bgcolor="#bbbbbb"
| 19 || March 13 || at  || Falcon Baseball Field • Colorado Springs, Colorado || colspan=7| Canceled (COVID-19 pandemic)
|- bgcolor="#bbbbbb"
| 20 || March 14 || at Air Force || Falcon Baseball Field • Colorado Springs, Colorado || colspan=7| Canceled (COVID-19 pandemic)
|- bgcolor="#bbbbbb"
| 21 || March 15 || at Air Force || Falcon Baseball Field • Colorado Springs, Colorado || colspan=7| Canceled (COVID-19 pandemic)
|- bgcolor="#bbbbbb"
| 22 || March 20 || at Texas Tech || Dan Law Field at Rip Griffin Park • Lubbock, Texas, || colspan=7| Canceled (COVID-19 pandemic)
|- bgcolor="#bbbbbb"
| 23 || March 21 || at Texas Tech || Dan Law Field at Rip Griffin Park • Lubbock, Texas || colspan=7| Canceled (COVID-19 pandemic)
|- bgcolor="#bbbbbb"
| 24 || March 22 || at Texas Tech || Dan Law Field at Rip Griffin Park • Lubbock, Texas || colspan=7| Canceled (COVID-19 pandemic)
|- bgcolor="#bbbbbb"
| 25 || March 27 || at  || Drayton McLane Baseball Stadium at John H. Kobs Field • East Lansing, Michigan, || colspan=7| Canceled (COVID-19 pandemic)
|- bgcolor="#bbbbbb"
| 26 || March 28 || at Michigan State || Drayton McLane Baseball Stadium at John H. Kobs Field • East Lansing, Michigan || colspan=7| Canceled (COVID-19 pandemic)
|- bgcolor="#bbbbbb"
| 27 || March 29 || at Michigan State || Drayton McLane Baseball Stadium at John H. Kobs Field • East Lansing, Michigan || colspan=7| Canceled (COVID-19 pandemic)
|-

|- bgcolor="#bbbbbb"
| 28 || April 3 ||  || Siebert Field • Minneapolis, Minnesota || colspan=7| Canceled (COVID-19 pandemic)
|- bgcolor="#bbbbbb"
| 29 || April 4 || Rutgers || Siebert Field • Minneapolis, Minnesota || colspan=7| Canceled (COVID-19 pandemic)
|- bgcolor="#bbbbbb"
| 30 || April 5 || Rutgers || Siebert Field • Minneapolis, Minnesota || colspan=7| Canceled (COVID-19 pandemic)
|- bgcolor="#bbbbbb"
| 31 || April 7 ||  || Siebert Field • Minneapolis, Minnesota || colspan=7| Canceled (COVID-19 pandemic)
|- bgcolor="#bbbbbb"
| 32 || April 8 || North Dakota State || Siebert Field • Minneapolis, Minnesota || colspan=7| Canceled (COVID-19 pandemic)
|- bgcolor="#bbbbbb"
| 33 || April 10 || at  || Illinois Field • Champaign, Illinois || colspan=7| Canceled (COVID-19 pandemic)
|- bgcolor="#bbbbbb"
| 34 || April 11 || at Illinois || Illinois Field • Champaign, Illinois || colspan=7| Canceled (COVID-19 pandemic)
|- bgcolor="#bbbbbb"
| 35 || April 12 || at Illinois || Illinois Field • Champaign, Illinois || colspan=7| Canceled (COVID-19 pandemic)
|- bgcolor="#bbbbbb"
| 36 || April 15 || South Dakota State || Siebert Field • Minneapolis, Minnesota || colspan=7| Canceled (COVID-19 pandemic)
|- bgcolor="#bbbbbb"
| 37 || April 17 ||  || Siebert Field • Minneapolis, Minnesota || colspan=7| Canceled (COVID-19 pandemic)
|- bgcolor="#bbbbbb"
| 38 || April 18 || Northwestern || Siebert Field • Minneapolis, Minnesota || colspan=7| Canceled (COVID-19 pandemic)
|- bgcolor="#bbbbbb"
| 39 || April 19 || Northwestern || Siebert Field • Minneapolis, Minnesota || colspan=7| Canceled (COVID-19 pandemic)
|- bgcolor="#bbbbbb"
| 40 || April 22 ||  || Siebert Field • Minneapolis, Minnesota || colspan=7| Canceled (COVID-19 pandemic)
|- bgcolor="#bbbbbb"
| 41 || April 24 || Purdue || Siebert Field • Minneapolis, Minnesota || colspan=7| Canceled (COVID-19 pandemic)
|- bgcolor="#bbbbbb"
| 42 || April 25 || Purdue|| Siebert Field • Minneapolis, Minnesota || colspan=7| Canceled (COVID-19 pandemic)
|- bgcolor="#bbbbbb"
| 43 || April 26 || Purdue || Siebert Field • Minneapolis, Minnesota || colspan=7| Canceled (COVID-19 pandemic)
|-

|- bgcolor="#bbbbbb"
| 44 || May 1 || at  || Duane Banks Field • Iowa City, Iowa || colspan=7| Canceled (COVID-19 pandemic)
|- bgcolor="#bbbbbb"
| 45 || May 2 || at Iowa || Duane Banks Field • Iowa City, Iowa || colspan=7| Canceled (COVID-19 pandemic)
|- bgcolor="#bbbbbb"
| 46 || May 3 || at Iowa || Duane Banks Field • Iowa City, Iowa || colspan=7| Canceled (COVID-19 pandemic)
|- bgcolor="#bbbbbb"
| 47 || May 4 ||  || Siebert Field • Minneapolis, Minnesota || colspan=7| Canceled (COVID-19 pandemic)
|- bgcolor="#bbbbbb"
| 48 || May 8 || Michigan || Siebert Field • Minneapolis, Minnesota || colspan=7| Canceled (COVID-19 pandemic)
|- bgcolor="#bbbbbb"
| 49 || May 9 || Michigan || Siebert Field • Minneapolis, Minnesota || colspan=7| Canceled (COVID-19 pandemic)
|- bgcolor="#bbbbbb"
| 50 || May 10 || Michigan || Siebert Field • Minneapolis, Minnesota || colspan=7| Canceled (COVID-19 pandemic)
|- bgcolor="#bbbbbb"
| 51 || May 14 || at  || Shipley Field • College Park, Maryland || colspan=7| Canceled (COVID-19 pandemic)
|- bgcolor="#bbbbbb"
| 52 || May 15 || at Maryland || Shipley Field • College Park, Maryland || colspan=7| Canceled (COVID-19 pandemic)
|- bgcolor="#bbbbbb"
| 53 || May 16 || at Maryland || Shipley Field • College Park, Maryland || colspan=7| Canceled (COVID-19 pandemic)
|-

2020 MLB draft

References

Minnesota
Minnesota Golden Gophers baseball seasons
Minnesota